The 1945 St. Louis Browns season involved the Browns finishing 3rd in the American League with a record of 81 wins and 70 losses.

Regular season 
Coming off their first pennant in 1944, St. Louis didn't regress very far but still finished six games off the pace.

Season standings

Record vs. opponents

Notable transactions 
 August 8, 1945: George Caster was selected off waivers from the Browns by the Detroit Tigers.

Roster

Player stats

Batting

Starters by position 
Note: Pos = Position; G = Games played; AB = At bats; H = Hits; Avg. = Batting average; HR = Home runs; RBI = Runs batted in

Other batters 
Note: G = Games played; AB = At bats; H = Hits; Avg. = Batting average; HR = Home runs; RBI = Runs batted in

Pitching

Starting pitchers 
Note: G = Games pitched; IP = Innings pitched; W = Wins; L = Losses; ERA = Earned run average; SO = Strikeouts

Other pitchers 
Note: G = Games pitched; IP = Innings pitched; W = Wins; L = Losses; ERA = Earned run average; SO = Strikeouts

Relief pitchers 
Note: G = Games pitched; W = Wins; L = Losses; SV = Saves; ERA = Earned run average; SO = Strikeouts

Farm system

Awards and honors

League top five finishers 
Nels Potter
 #2 in AL in strikeouts (129)

Vern Stephens
 Led AL in home runs (24)
 #2 in AL in runs scored (90)
 #2 in AL in slugging percentage (.473)
 #3 in AL in RBI (89)

References

External links
1945 St. Louis Browns team page at Baseball Reference
1945 St. Louis Browns season at baseball-almanac.com

St. Louis Browns seasons
Saint Louis Browns season
St Louis Browns